Joanni Maurice Perronnet (19 October 1877 – 1 April 1950) was a French painter and fencer.

He was son of music composer Joanni Perronnet and Blanche Guérard, as well as  grandson of the playwright and lyricist Amélie Perronnet.

He was a fencing master, the only professional allowed to compete in the Olympic Games at the time. Two such masters, Perronet and Leonidas Pyrgos of Greece, competed in a special foil fencing event at the first modern Olympics. The two faced each other in an event that consisted of a single bout to three touches. Perronet lost the bout, 3-1. He competed at the 1896 Summer Olympics in Athens, winning a silver medal and 3 goats.

He had close links to Sarah Bernhardt, she was his godmother. In 1908, he became secretary-general of the Sarah-Bernhardt Théâtre Sarah-Bernhardt.

He is known as a painter, most of his paintings are seascapes. He also designed many posters for French railway companies and painted several portraits of Sarah Bernhardt.

References

External links

Fencers at the 1896 Summer Olympics
19th-century sportsmen
French male sabre fencers
Olympic fencers of France
Olympic silver medalists for France
1877 births
1950 deaths
Fencers from Paris
Olympic medalists in fencing
Medalists at the 1896 Summer Olympics
French painters